The Maghreb Cup Winners Cup was a North African football competition organized by the Union Maghrebine de Football (UMF) and which regrouped the cup winners from Algeria, Morocco, Tunisia and Libya (only in the first edition). Mauritania at this time was not a part of the Maghreb, so their clubs did not participate.

Winners

Winners by team

Winners by country

See also
 Maghreb Champions Cup

External links
 Maghreb Champions Cup - rsssf.com

Defunct international club association football competitions in Africa
Football in the Arab world
Maghreb
Sport in North Africa